Lev Aleksandrovich Zilber (March 15 [O.S. March 27], 1894 – November 10, 1966) was a Soviet micro-biologist, virologist, and immunologist; academician of the USSR Academy of Medical Sciences (AMN SSSR; 1945), founder of the Soviet school of virology. The elder brother of the writer Veniamin Kaverin.

Biography 
Zilber was born on March 15 [O.S. March 27] 1894 in the family of the kapellmeister Abel Zilber and his wife, née Khana Girshevna (Anna Grigorievna) Desson, pianist and owner of music stores. Place of birth – the village of Medved, Medved volost, Novgorod Governorate. His sister Leya (married Elena Aleksandrovna Tynyanova, 1892–1944) is the wife of the writer and literary critic Yury Tynyanov, a classmate of Lev Zilber. His younger brothers: military doctor David Zilber (1897–1967), composer and conductor Alexander Ruchiov (1899–1970) and writer Veniamin Kaverin (1902–1989).

Career 
In 1912, Zilber graduated from the Pskov provincial gymnasium with a silver medal and entered the natural department of the Faculty of physics and mathematics of St. Petersburg Imperial University. In 1915 he transferred to the medical faculty of Moscow University, having received permission to attend classes at the natural department at the same time and graduated from it in 1919.

Having left in 1919 as a volunteer for the front he served in the Red Army in various positions from a doctor to the head of the medical unit. He was taken prisoner by the whites, but successfully escaped. Since 1921, he worked at the Institute of microbiology of the People's Commissariat for Health in Moscow.

In 1928 he married with Zinaida Yermolyeva. The first months after the wedding Zilber and Yermolyeva spent working at the Pasteur Institute in France and the Robert Koch Institute in Germany. In 1929, he was sent by the People's Commissar for Health N. Semashko to suppress an outbreak of typhoid fever in the city of Dzerzhinsk near Nizhny Novgorod.

First arrests 

In 1929, he accepted an offer to take the position of director of the Azerbaijan Institute of microbiology and head of the department of microbiology at the Medical University in Baku. He led the suppression of an outbreak of plague in the villages of Bulutan and Hadrut in Nagorno-Karabakh in 1930. Upon his return to Baku, he was introduced to the Order of the Red Banner, but was soon arrested on charges of sabotage to infect the population of Azerbaijan with plague. He was released after 4 months (possibly, at the request of Maxim Gorky, who was approached by the younger brother of Lev Zilber, writer Veniamin Kaverin, perhaps due to the efforts of his ex-wife Zinaida Yermolyeva). Upon his release, Zilber worked in Moscow heading the department of microbiology at the Central Institute for the Improvement of Doctors and head of the microbiological department of the State Scientific and Control Institute of the People's Commissariat for Health of the RSFSR named after Lev Tarasevich.

In 1932, he led the elimination of an outbreak of smallpox in Kazakhstan and in 1935 he also married with Valeria Petrovna Kiseleva.

In 1935–1936 he achieved the creation of the Central Virus Laboratory under the People's Commissariat for Health of the RSFSR and the opening of a department of virology at the Institute of Microbiology of the USSR Academy of Sciences.

In 1937, he led the Far Eastern expedition of the People's Commissariat for Health of the USSR to study an unknown infectious disease of the central nervous system. During the work of the expedition the nature of the disease – tick-borne encephalitis was clarified and methods of dealing with it were proposed.

Immediately upon his return, he was arrested on denunciations of an attempt to infect Moscow with encephalitis and concealment of the fact that encephalitis was brought into the USSR by Japanese saboteurs. In June 1939 he was released. Zilber participated in the struggle for his release. His brother Kaverin, Ermolyeva, colleagues on the Far Eastern expedition A. K. Shubladze, Mikhail Chumakov, V. D. Solovyov and many others participated in the struggle for his release.

In 1939, he became the head of the virology department at the Gamaleya Research Institute of Epidemiology, which he led until his death in 1966 with a break during the third arrest (1940–1944).

Third arrest 
In 1940 Zilber was arrested for the third time. While imprisoned, he served part of his term in camps on the Pechora river, where in the conditions of the tundra he received a yeast preparation against pellagra from the reindeer moss and saved the lives of hundreds of prisoners who died from complete vitamin deficiency. He received a copyright certificate for the invention, the certificate was recorded in the name of the "NKVD". He refused repeated offers to work on bacteriological weapons. Remembering Zilber's ability to get alcohol from reindeer moss, the authorities sent him to a chemical "sharashka", where he began carcinoma research. For tobacco the prisoners caught mice and rats for Zilber for experiments. In the course of research, he formulated a new concept of the origin of cancerous tumors.

After release 
In March 1944, on the eve of Zilber's 50th birthday, he was released thanks to a letter of innocence addressed to Joseph Stalin and signed by chief surgeon of the Red Army Nikolai Burdenko, Vice President of the USSR Academy of Sciences Leon Orbeli, academician Nikolay Gamaleya, biochemist Vladimir Engelgardt and Zinaida Yermolyeva (the creator of Soviet penicillin and Zilber's ex-wife), who was the initiator of the appeal along with his other colleagues and students.

In the summer of 1945, he found and took his family to the USSR – his wife, wife's sister and two sons who survived in German work camps, where they spent 3.5 years. In the same year, he was elected an academician of the newly created USSR Academy of Medical Sciences, appointed scientific director of the Institute of virology of the USSR Academy of Medical Sciences and headed the Department of virology and tumor immunology of the Institute of epidemiology, microbiology and infectious diseases of the USSR Academy of Medical Sciences, where he worked all subsequent years.

He was occupied with basing and elaborating a viral theory of the origin of cancer. Zilber received the State Prize of the USSR in 1946; in 1967 he was posthumously awarded the State Prize of the USSR for discovering the pathogenicity of the virus of Rous sarcoma of fowl for other classes of animals (cycle of works, 1957–66). He was awarded the Order of Lenin, the Order of the Red Banner of Labor and medals.

In 1958 he participated in the 7th International Cancer Congress in London. In 1959–1965 he participates in the WHO working group on cancer, in the work of international symposiums and conferences on the problems on oncology in Berlin, Libice nad Cidlinou, London, Bratislava, Warsaw, Turin, Prague.

In 1965 he is was an organizer and participant of the International Symposium on Cancer Immunology in Sukhumi.

On November 10, 1966, Lev Zilber died suddenly in his office at the Gamaleya Research Institute and was buried at the Novodevichy Cemetery.

Family 
Zilber's children subsequently became famous scientists: Lev Lvovich Kiselev (1936–2008) – molecular biologist, academician of the Russian Academy of Sciences, and Fedor Lvovich Kiselev (1940–2016) – molecular biologist, specialist in carcinogenesis, corresponding member of the Russian Academy of Medical Sciences.

Brother of Lev Zilber – David Alexandrovich (Abelevich) Zilber (1897–1967), hygienist and head of the department of general and military hygiene, dean of the medical and preventive faculty of the Perm State Medical Institute, author of the book Pharmacy Hygiene (1962), a textbook for pharmaceutical faculties "Hygiene" (1970).

The wife of his brother Alexander (Ekaterina Ivanovna Zilber, 1904–1963) in her second marriage was married to the playwright Evgeny Schwartz.

Scientific discoveries 
Lev Zilber is the author of the scientific discovery "New properties of the pathogenicity of tumor viruses", which is listed in the State Register of Discoveries of the USSR. In 1967, for the discovery of the pathogenicity of the Rous sarcoma virus for other classes of animals he was posthumously awarded the State Prize of the USSR.

He is also the author of more than 300 scientific articles published in domestic and foreign journals, as well as popular science articles and essays. Member of the associations of oncologists of US, France and Belgium, member of the Royal Society of Medicine, honorary member of the New York Academy of Sciences, organizer and chairman of the committee on virology and cancer immunology at the Union for International Cancer Control, WHO expert in immunology and virology.

Awards 

 Medal "For Merit to Science and Humanity" of the Czech Academy of Sciences.
 Medal of the Czechoslovak Medical Society named after Jan Purkyně.
 The order of Lenin.
 The order of the Red Banner of Labour.

Bibliography 

 "Paraimmunity". M. 1928
 "Immunity". M.4 l. 1937. Jointly with V. A. Lyubarsky
 "Epidemic encephalitis". M. 1945.
 "Viral theory of the origin of malignant tumors". M. 1946.
 Fundamentals of immunity. M.1948.
 "Teaching about viruses: (General virology)". M.1956.
 "Fundamentals of immunology" M. 1958.
 "Bazel immunology. Bucuresti". 1959. In Romanian.
 "Virology and Immunology of cancer". M., 1962. Jointly. with G. I. Abelev.

Posthumous publications 

 "Virus-genetic theory of the origin of tumors". M., Science, 1968.
 "The virology and immunology of cancer". L., 1968. With G.I. Abelev.
 "Selected Works: Bacteria, Viruses, Cancer, Immunity". L., from Medicine, 1971.
 "Evolution of the virus-genetic theory of tumors". M., Science, 1975. Jointly with I.S. Irlin and F. L. Kiselev.

See also 

 Microbiology
 Veniamin Kaverin

References

Sources 

 Kiselev, L. and Levina E. S. Lev Aleksandrovich Zilber (1894–1966): life in science. Science, 2004. — 698 p. (Scientific and biographical literature). ISBN 5-02-032751-4.

External links 
 Death bypasses the backyard of science
 Zil’ber, Lev Aleksandrovich
 Зильбер Лев Александрович (1894) – Открытый список (ru.openlist.wiki)
 Lev Zilber – creator of national school medical virologists
 Zilber Lev Alexandrovich. From the lecture: on the viral theory of cancer – audio, read in 1963

1894 births
1966 deaths
Stalin Prize winners
Recipients of the USSR State Prize
Recipients of the Order of the Red Banner of Labour
Soviet physicians
Soviet virologists
Academicians of the USSR Academy of Medical Sciences
Burials at Novodevichy Cemetery
20th-century physicians
20th-century scientists
Recipients of the Order of Lenin
Soviet microbiologists
Soviet immunologists